C.F. Badalona Futur S.A.D. is a Spanish football team based in Badalona, Barcelona, in the Autonomous Community of Catalonia. Founded in 1947, it currently plays in Segunda Federación – Group 3. Its home stadium is Estadi Municipal, with a capacity for 4,000 spectators.

History

Leandro Calm, the mayor of the city, founded the club as Unión Deportiva Llagostera on 13 November 1947. He also became its first president. Llagostera spent most of its history in the Catalan regional leagues, promoting to Tercera División for the first time ahead of the 2009–10 season. In only its second season at that level, the club won its group before defeating CCD Cerceda 3–0 on aggregate in the promotion play-offs.

In 2011–12, its first season in Segunda División B, Llagostera finished only one point out of the play-offs, instead qualifying for the next season's Copa del Rey, where it reached the last 32 before a 5–1 aggregate loss to giants Valencia CF. The team was promoted to the professional leagues for the first time in 2014 with a 3–2 aggregate comeback win over Real Avilés and beating Gimnàstic de Tarragona after the overtime in the last round of the playoffs.

As their stadium did not meet LFP criteria for home games, Llagostera had as its home stadium from 2014 to 2017 the Estadi Palamós Costa Brava, 30 km from Llagostera, which holds 3,724 spectators. The club held its own in its first season in Segunda División, coming within four points of a play-off berth. It was relegated back to the third tier towards after two seasons.

On 30 June 2017, the club announced it would come back to the Estadi Municipal de Llagostera. One year later, Llagostera would be relegated to Tercera División, after losing the relegation playoffs against Izarra, but bounced back immediately with victory against Club Portugalete in June 2019.

In the 2020 Copa Federación de España, Llagostera emerged as champions following a 2–1 extra time win in the final. On 31 July 2021, the club announced the change of name to Unió Esportiva Costa Brava, moving to the city of Palamós and changing the club's logo.

On 19 July 2022, Costa Brava was absorbed by CF Badalona. As Badalona was relegated to Tercera Federación, Costa Brava changed name to Club de Fútbol Badalona Futur, with the original Badalona acting as a reserve team.

Club background

1947–1972: Unión Deportiva Llagostera
1972–1981: Club de Fútbol Llagostera
1981–2004: Unión Deportiva Llagostera
2004–2015: Unió Esportiva Llagostera
2015–2021: Unió Esportiva Llagostera-Costa Brava
2021–2022: Unió Esportiva Costa Brava
2022–: Club de Fútbol Badalona Futur

Season to season

2 seasons in Segunda División
1 season in Primera División RFEF
7 seasons in Segunda División B
1 season in Segunda Federación
3 seasons in Tercera División

Players

Current squad

Notable players

Note: this list includes players that have played at least 100 league games and/or have reached international status.

Honours

League
Segunda División B
Winners: 2013–14

Tercera División
Winners: 2010–11, 2018–19

Tercera Catalana
Winners: 2005–06

Cups
Spanish Royal Federation Cup
Winners: 2020

References

External links
Official website 
Futbolme team profile 
Club & stadium history 

 
 
Football clubs in Catalonia
Association football clubs established in 1947
1947 establishments in Spain
Segunda División clubs
Primera Federación clubs
Football clubs in Spain